Protein phosphatase 1, regulatory subunit 27 is a protein in humans that is encoded by the PPP1R27 gene.

References

Further reading 

Human proteins